Shivank Vashisht (born 17 September 1995) is an Indian cricketer. He made his first-class debut for Delhi in the 2018–19 Ranji Trophy on 6 December 2018. He made his Twenty20 debut on 19 January 2021, for Delhi in the 2020–21 Syed Mushtaq Ali Trophy. He made his List A debut on 21 February 2021, for Delhi in the 2020–21 Vijay Hazare Trophy.

References

External links
 

1995 births
Living people
Indian cricketers
Place of birth missing (living people)
Delhi cricketers